The Citizens Action Party (formerly the British Columbia Grey Party) was a minor political party in British Columbia, Canada.  It was formed in 2002 as a protest movement of senior citizens against their perceived victimization by the BC Liberal Party.  Its leader was Bill Savage.

The party changed its name in an effort to broaden its support base, and put forward a platform heavily invoking "common sense" solutions to political problems.

In September 2004, it joined with the British Columbia Democratic Alliance, Link BC and the British Columbia Moderate Democratic Movement to form the "British Columbia Democratic Coalition".  Link BC and the CAP pulled out of the coalition less than a month later, and announced their own plans to merge under the Link BC name.  The BCDC became the founding core of Democratic Reform British Columbia. The Citizens Action Party was de-registered by Elections BC in June 2009.

See also
List of British Columbia political parties

External links
CAP BC

Provincial political parties in British Columbia
Citizens' Action Parties
2002 establishments in British Columbia
Political parties established in 2002
2009 disestablishments in British Columbia
Political parties disestablished in 2009
Pensioners' parties